Game Over is a 2004 American adult computer-animated sitcom created by David Sacks (who later became president of Nickelodeon Animation Studio), produced by Carsey-Werner Productions, and broadcast on UPN in 2004. It was cancelled after five episodes.

Game Over (the title was inspired by the phrase "game over" that commonly concludes video games) focused on what happens to video game characters after the game ends. It recounted the lives of the Smashenburns, a far-from-ordinary suburban family that lived in an alternate video game universe.

The show made numerous references to video games and even featured certain game characters as cameos. For example, Crash Bandicoot appears on a Got Milk? billboard, and creatures from Oddworld: Abe's Oddysee appear in one of the episodes.

Marisa Tomei voiced the character of Raquel Smashenburn in the series' unaired pilot episode, but scheduling problems saw Lucy Liu take over the role for the actual series.

Game Over was heavily hyped by UPN before its debut. It generally received positive press on its airing. Despite this, only six episodes were made, which aired on a variety of different days – the fourth and fifth episodes were broadcast on April 2, 2004, and the sixth episode ("Monkey Dearest") was not aired.

Characters
 Rip Smashenburn, a Grand Prix driver who races every day and crashes his car all the time. (Patrick Warburton)
 Raquel Smashenburn, a covert agent who fights monsters and is vaguely similar to Lara Croft. (Lucy Liu)
 Alice Smashenburn, a cynical yet socially conscious 14-year-old. Is part of a beach volleyball team, but wears a hoodie instead of a skimpy bikini. (Rachel Dratch)
 Billy Smashenburn, a 13-year-old hoping to become a rapper. (Elizabeth Daily)
 Turbo, their pet, a 300-pound talking doglike creature who robs pawn shops and smokes cigars. (Artie Lange)
 The Changs, including Dark Princess Chang (Marie Matiko), a family of Kung-Fu-fighting Shaolin monks who live next door.
 Another Next door neighbour who talks to Rip in first person perspective.

Episodes

Home media
Anchor Bay Entertainment released all six episodes of the series as Game Over: The Complete Series on DVD in North America on June 28, 2005.

References

External links
 Official UPN website for Game Over
 Carsey-Werner Game Over
 

2000s American adult animated television series
2000s American sitcoms
2004 American television series debuts
2004 American television series endings
American adult animated comedy television series
American adult computer-animated television series
American animated sitcoms
English-language television shows
Television series by Carsey-Werner Productions
UPN original programming
Animated television series about families